{{DISPLAYTITLE:Iota2 Cygni}}

Iota2 Cygni, Latinized from ι2 Cygni and often simply called ι Cygni, is a single star in the constellation Cygnus. It is visible to the naked eye as a white-hued point of light with an apparent visual magnitude of 3.76. Located around  distant from the Sun based on parallax, it is drifting closer with a radial velocity of −19.5 km/s and is expected to come to within  in around 783,000 years.

This it is an A-type main-sequence star with a stellar classification of A5V, a star that is currently fusing its core hydrogen. It is around 577 million years old and is spinning rapidly with a projected rotational velocity of 240 km/s. The star has 1.8 times the mass of the Sun and 3.8 times the Sun's radius. It is radiating 35 times the luminosity of the Sun from its photosphere at an effective temperature of 8,216 K. Based on rapid changes in the strength of a singly-ionized calcium absorption line, the star is likely host to a circumstellar disk.

References

A-type main-sequence stars
Circumstellar disks

Cygnus (constellation)
Cygni, Iota2
Durchmusterung objects
Cygni, 10
184006
095853
7420